INCAE Business School is an international business school located at the Francisco de Sola campus in Nicaragua and the Walter Kissling Gam campus in Costa Rica. The Financial Times has ranked INCAE as a top global MBA program and The Wall Street Journal has ranked INCAE Business School as one of the top 10 international business schools in the world.

INCAE is an acronym for Instituto Centroamericano de Administración de Empresas, which means "Central American Institute of Business Administration" in Spanish. The school was founded by Harvard Business School in 1964.  Although INCAE is independent, it adheres to the Harvard Case Study Method and curriculum. The Case Study Method allow students to examine past and current business situations, which gives them two years' worth of indirect, real-world experience across industries and regions.  The Method offers students the opportunity to step into the shoes of managers, critique their decisions and provide alternative solutions. While the majority of cases are translations from Harvard Business School case studies, INCAE students are additionally provided with emerging market studies from Latin America.

INCAE offers a 2-year MBA in Costa Rica and a 15-month intensive MBA in Nicaragua. Other programs include the Executive MBA and seminars.

History
On March 23, 1963, President John F. Kennedy visited Costa Rica and met with the presidents of Guatemala, El Salvador, Honduras, Nicaragua, and Costa Rica. In the meeting, the presidents requested Kennedy's assistance in establishing a business administration program that would produce future managers. On April 10, President Kennedy wrote to George P. Baker, Dean of the Harvard Business School, thanking the school for taking interest in the initiative. Dean Baker sent three professors, George Cabot Lodge, Henry Arthur and Thomas Raymond, to gauge the level of support from the business community and society at large in each of the Central American countries for the project.

Francisco de Sola, a Salvadoran business leader, took the leadership role in consolidating support for the project. On December 13, 1963, a provisional administrative committee was appointed to head the project that would be known as the INCAE Project. Francisco de Sola was named Chairman of the Administrative Committee, a position he would hold for the next twenty years. The founding Rector of the school was Ernesto Cruz.

INCAE's first academic program was the Advanced Management Program, PAG for its name in Spanish. Between the first of July and the seventh of August, 1964, 45 executives from countries in the region gathered in Antigua, Guatemala, for the program. The first PAG was taught by Harvard Business School professors. In subsequent years some PAG students attended Harvard University's International Teacher Program (ITP). Some of them later went on to complete doctoral programs at Harvard Business School and returned to become part of INCAE's faculty. In 1969, INCAE's first MBA was awarded.

Nicaragua was chosen as the permanent site for INCAE, and on June 20, 1969 INCAE's first campus was inaugurated in Montefresco, Nicaragua. The 70-hectare site was purchased with funds raised through donations from the private sector and the governments of Central America, the result of a campaign headed by INCAE's National Committee in Nicaragua. Montefresco was chosen from the other options in Nicaragua because of its scenery and cool climate. It was also close to Managua, the capital of Nicaragua. The campus was built with a loan provided by the Central American Bank for Economic Integration (BCIE) with USAID funding. INCAE's first fifteen MBA classes graduated in Nicaragua. (?)

In 1983, INCAE decided to move its MBA program. The second campus, called the Walter Kissling Gam campus, opened in Alajuela, Costa Rica in 1984.  Costa Rica was chosen because of its  stable government and existing infrastructure.  In 1996, INCAE reopened the full-time MBA program in the Montefresco campus, and in 2000 the Montefresco campus also began to offer the executive MBA program.

Faculty
INCAE has over 40 faculty members who teach in the MBA program and the executive education programs. Ninety-two percent of the faculty hold doctorate degrees. INCAE's student-to-faculty ratio is six to one. 2017

INCAE requires its professors to have contact with the business sector to ensure that the material they present in the classroom is up to date and relevant. This contact occurs through consulting work for firms. Professors are encouraged to conduct research and publish their findings in peer-reviewed journals.

Accreditations and associations
INCAE is accredited by SACS (Southern Association of Colleges and Schools) in the United States to grant master's degrees. It is also accredited by EQUIS (European Quality Improvement System),  AACSB (Association to Advance Collegiate Schools of Business. and by AMBA (Association of MBAs.

INCAE is one of only 13 business schools in Latin America that have been accredited by AACSB. In 1994, it was the first business school outside North America to be accredited by SACS.

INCAE is affiliated with business school associations, such as AACSB International (Association to Advance Collegiate Schools of Business), NASPAA (National Association of Schools of Public Affairs and Administration), and BALAS(The Business Association of Latin American Studies). Additionally, it is a member of CLADEA the Latin American Business School Council, Partnership in International Management (PIM), and the Global Network for Advanced Management (GNAM). INCAE is part of the CFA Institute's   "University Affiliation Program"

Recognition
INCAE ranks high among business schools in Latin America. .

In the 2010 QS Global 200 Business Schools Report the school was placed fifth in South America.

Honorary doctorates
INCAE has conferred honorary doctorates to individuals who have positively impacted society. Among the most distinguished are:
(1976) Anastasio Somoza Debayle, President of Nicaragua, 1967-1972
(1977) George F.F. Lombard, Associate Dean Harvard Business School
(1984) Luis Alberto Monge, President of Costa Rica, 1982–1986
(1987) Marc Lindenberg, Rector of INCAE, 1982–1987
(1988) Oscar Arias, President of Costa Rica, 1986–1990, 2006–2010
(1991) Hernando de Soto, Peruvian economist and ideologist
(1991) Pablo Antonio Cuadra, Nicaraguan poet and ideologist
(1993) Stephan Schmidheiny, Swiss businessman
(1994) George Cabot Lodge, emeritus professor of Harvard Business School and key person for the establishment of INCAE
(1996) Michael Porter, academic and professor of Harvard Business School
(1997) Violeta Barrios de Chamorro, first woman president of Nicaragua 1990-1997
(1999) Walter Kissling Gam, Costa Rican businessman
(2005) Alberto Motta Cardoze, Panamanian businessman and philanthropist
(2005) F. Alfredo Pellas Ch., Nicaraguan businessman

Agreements
INCAE has agreements with universities in North America, Latin American, Europe and Asia. The school has two types of agreements. First, INCAE has exchange and/or dual-degree programs with the following universities:
KEDGE Business School
Yale University - Yale School of Management
University of Michigan - The Ford School
University of St. Gallen - Strategy & International Management (SIM)
University of California San Diego - School of Global Policy and Strategy
Northwestern University - Kellogg School of Management
University of Victoria - Peter B. Gustavson School of Business
Case Western Reserve University - Weatherhead School of Management
College of William and Mary - Mason School of Business
Duke University - Fuqua School of Business
Emory University - Goizueta Business School
Vanderbilt University - Owen Graduate School of Management
New York University - Stern School of Business
Erasmus University - Rotterdam School of Management
ESADE Business School
ZLC - MIT Global Scale Network
ESC - Toulouse Business School
European Business School - University of Business and Law
Florida International University College of Business
HHL Leipzig Graduate School of Management
Instituto de Empresa (IE)
Kozminski University - Leon Kozminski Academy of Entrepreneurship and Management
National Chengchi University
NUCB Business School
Pepperdine University - Graziadio School of Business and Management
Rice University - Jones Graduate School of Business
Thunderbird School of Global Management
University of Michigan - Ross School of Business
University of Minnesota - Carlson School of Management
University of North Carolina at Chapel Hill – Kenan-Flagler Business School
University of Southern California - Marshall School of Business
University of St. Thomas - Opus College of Business
University of Texas at Austin - McCombs Business School
University of Wisconsin - Wisconsin School of Business
Umeå University - Umeå School of Business
Vanderbilt University - Owen Graduate School of Management
WHU – Otto Beisheim School of Management
Hitotsubashi University Business School
Zaragoza Logistics Center

The second type of agreement provides discounts for the MBA program to accepted applicants who earned their undergraduate degrees from the following schools:
Universidad Argentina de la Empresa, UADE - Argentina
Universidad Privada Boliviana, UPB - Bolivia
University of Talca - Chile
University of the Pacific - Chile
Universidad Externado de Colombia - Colombia
Autonomous University of Bucaramanga - Colombia
University of Costa Rica - Costa Rica
Costa Rica Institute of Technology - Costa Rica
EARTH - Costa Rica
ULACIT - Costa Rica
Universidad San Francisco de Quito - Ecuador
ESPOL - Ecuador
Universidad Católica de Guayaquil - Ecuador
Universidad de Especialidades Espíritu Santo - Ecuador
ESEN - El Salvador
Rafael Landívar University - Guatemala
Universidad Francisco Marroquín - Guatemala
University of San Pedro Sula - Honduras
Escuela Agrícola Panamericana Zamorano - Honduras
UDLAP - Mexico
Keiser University-Latin American Campus - Nicaragua
Universidad Americana UAM - Nicaragua
Latin University of Panama - Panama
Universidad Nacional de Asunción - Paraguay
Universidad Nacional - Paraguay
University of the Pacific - Peru
University of Puerto Rico - Puerto Rico
Universidad del Este - Puerto Rico
Universidad Metropolitana - Puerto Rico
University of Turabo - Puerto Rico
Santo Domingo Institute of Technology - Dominican Republic
University of the West Indies - Trinidad y Tobago
Catholic University of Uruguay - Uruguay
Andrés Bello National University – Venezuela

References

Institutions of Costa Rica
Business schools in Costa Rica
Business schools in Nicaragua
Managua
Universities and colleges accredited by the Southern Association of Colleges and Schools
Educational institutions established in 1964
1964 establishments in Guatemala